Jemima Harbort (born 4 September 1987) is an Australian handball player for Queensland HC and the Australian national team.

She participated at the 2009 World Women's Handball Championship in China, the 2011 World Women's Handball Championship in Brazil, the 2013 World Women's Handball Championship in Serbia, and the 2019 World Women's Handball Championship in Japan.

References

External links
Eurosport profile
HSG Pforzheim profile (German)
Handball.Hu profile (Hungarian)

1987 births
Living people
Australian female handball players
Sportspeople from Brisbane
Expatriate handball players
Australian expatriate sportspeople in Germany